Hutchison is a census designated place in Fairfax County, Virginia, United States. It is a residential development just north of Virginia State Route 267, located 23 miles west of Washington, D.C. The community is one of the census-designated places newly recognized for the 2020 United States census.

As of the 2020 census, the population of Hutchison is 6,231.

History 
Northwestern Fairfax County was not destroyed during the Civil War and instead used as a supply station for both the Union and the Confederacy. After the war, Union soldiers and Northern civilians alike relocated to the inexpensive area, with most residents being dairy farmers for the next few decades. In 1912, Herndon began receiving service from an electric trolley operated by the Washington & Old Dominion Railroad, and the area experienced further growth from Washington workers who rode the trolley.

Hutchison itself began to be developed during the 1970s, with a mixture of single-family homes and townhomes modeled on those of nearby Reston. In 1975, Hutchison Elementary School was founded to serve the small community, previously served by Herndon Elementary School.

References

Census-designated places in Fairfax County, Virginia
Census-designated places in Virginia